The Premios 40 Principales for Best Panamanian Act was an honor presented annually at Los Premios 40 Principales between 2008 and 2011, reemerging in 2014 as part of Los Premios 40 Principales América.

References

2011 music awards